Swedish Super League (formerly, Elitserien) is the highest league in the league system of Swedish floorball and comprises the top 14 Swedish floorball teams. The first season began in 1995–96. The season ends with a play-off and a final.

The champion of the league is eligible to compete at the Champions Cup.

History
The Swedish Super League was founded in 1995 under the name Elitserien. It then replaced the Division 1 league as the high level floorball league of Sweden. Between the seasons 1995–96 and 1998–99 the league was divided into a northern and a southern group. Since the 1999–2000 season, it is a national league.

In March 2007, it was decided that the Elitserien will comprise 14 teams from the 2008–09 season.

In May 2007, the name of league was changed from Elitserien to the Swedish Super League.

Mika Kohonen holds the record for points in one season (107 p in 29 games) and also the all-time record for points.

Season structure
The season starts with a regular season with 26 matches per team, one home and one away against all teams. In the spring a play-off starts with the eight best teams from the regular season. The quarter finals is played in best of seven matches, while the semi finals is played in best of five matches, the final is settled in just one. The final was played in Stockholm Globe Arena until 2010, and as of 2011 the final game is played in Malmö Arena. From 2015 the final is back to Stockholm Globe Arena. The women's Swedish Super League final is played earlier on the same day, in the same arena.

Current clubs

SSL clubs in season 2022–23:
AIK Innebandy
FBC Kalmarsund
FC Helsingborg
Gävle GIK
Hagunda IF
IBF Falun
IBK Dalen
Jönköpings IK
Linköping IBK
Mullsjö AIS
Pixbo Wallenstam IBK
Storvreta IBK
Team Thorengruppen
Växjö IBK

Previous winners
List of winners from:

1983 – Kolarbyn
1984 – Tomasgården
1985 – Kolarbyn
1986 – Norrstrand
1987 – Lockerud
1988 – Lockerud
1989 – Kolarbyn/Fagersta
1990 – Lockerud
1991 – Lockerud
1992 – Lockerud
1993 – Balrog
1994 – Fornudden
1995 – Kista
1996 – Balrog IK
1997 – Fornudden IB
1998 – Warberg IC 85
1999 – Haninge IBK
2000 – Haninge IBK
2001 – Haninge IBK
2002 – Pixbo Wallenstam IBK
2003 – Pixbo Wallenstam IBK
2004 – Balrog IK
2005 – Warberg IC 85
2006 – AIK
2007 – Warberg IC
2008 – Warberg IC
2009 – AIK
2010 – Storvreta IBK
2011 – Storvreta IBK
2012 – Storvreta IBK
2013 – IBF Falun
2014 – IBF Falun
2015 – IBF Falun
2016 – Storvreta IBK
2017 – IBF Falun 
2018 – Storvreta IBK
2019 – Storvreta IBK
2020 – IBF Falun
2021 – IBF Falun
2022 – IBF Falun

References

External links

 Official website

Floorball competitions in Sweden
Sports leagues in Sweden
Sports leagues established in 1995
1995 establishments in Sweden
Professional sports leagues in Sweden